Esfarvarin (also Romanized as Asfarvarīn) is a city and capital of Esfarvarin District, in Takestan County, Qazvin Province, Iran.It is famous for this grape fields. At the 2006 census its population was 12,104, in 2,670 families. People of Esfarvarin are Tat, Persian and Azerbaijani they speak Tati language, Persian and Azerbaijani.

References 

Populated places in Takestan County
Cities in Qazvin Province